WHIF (91.3 FM "Hope FM") is a religious radio station that broadcasts a Christian Contemporary music format. Licensed to Palatka, Florida, U.S, the station is currently owned by Putnam Radio Ministries.

The FCC first licensed this station to begin operations on August 17, 1993, using callsign WAEQ

The station has held the WHIF callsign since May 23, 1994.

References

External links

Contemporary Christian radio stations in the United States
Putnam County, Florida
Radio stations established in 1996
1996 establishments in Florida
HIF